Tie Sing was a Chinese American head chef for the U.S. Geological Survey at Yosemite.

Career

Tie Sing was among the Chinese Americans that came to the US during the 1848 Californian Gold Rush. In 1850, California passed the Foreign Miners' Tax Act, which imposed taxes on non-American miners and laborers. These taxes, alongside the dwindling gold supply, forced many Chinese Americans to find new opportunities, and many ended up in Yosemite as hotel cooks and road builders. Many of these Chinese American cooks subsequently gained prominence for their culinary skills, becoming head chefs in hotels.

Tie Sing was the head chef for the U.S Geological Survey and was known for his innovative spirit that enabled good food to be made in the backcountry despite undeveloped infrastructure. Tie Sing was known for wrapping meat in wet newspaper and cooling it in the breeze. He would also drape rounds of biscuit dough on working mules, using their body heat to rise the dough.

In 1899, Sing Peak was named after Tie Sing by the U.S. Geological Survey for his outstanding service. This honor was unique for being conferred during Tie Sing's lifetime and also during a time of heightened racism and xenophobia against Chinese Americans. The Chinese Exclusion Act had been passed seven years ago in 1882 and would remain in force until the passage of the Magnuson Act in 1943.

In 1915, Tie Sing was hired by Stephen Mather to cook for business and cultural leaders at a two-week wilderness expedition. Mather's intention was to convince people in power to preserve nature by giving them an enjoyable experience through Tie Sing's cooking, telling park supervisors that while nature was a “splendid thing” when experienced by a content person, “give him a poor breakfast after he has had a bad night's sleep, and he will not care how fine your scenery is”. Mather's plan worked, and the National Park Service was established a year after in 1916.

Tie Sing died in a 1918 “field accident,” which possibly involved a cooking-gas explosion.

Legacy 
Tie Sing's contributions remained relatively unknown until 2011, when park ranger Yen Yen Chan co-produced a YouTube documentary highlighting the history of Chinese Americans in Yosemite. This prompted Jack Shu to propose an annual pilgrimage to Sing Peak in honor of Tie Sing's legacy, as well as the contributions of Chinese Americans to Yosemite as a whole.

See also 

 Anti-Chinese sentiment in the United States
 Asian Americans in California
 Coolie
 History of Chinese Americans
 John Muir

References

Further reading

United States Geological Survey personnel
Asian American chefs
Qing dynasty emigrants to the United States

Year of birth missing
1918 deaths